Mududida Tavare Aralithu is a 1983 Indian Kannada-language romantic drama film, directed by K. V. Jayaram. It is based on the novel of the same name by Chitralekha. The film stars Ananth Nag, K. S. Ashwath and Lakshmi.

Cast
 Anant Nag
 Lakshmi
 K. S. Ashwath
 K N Bharathi
 Mukhyamantri Chandru
 Leelavathi
 Mysore Lokesh
 Advani Lakshmi Devi
 Uma Shivakumar
 Musuri Krishnamurthy
 Dingri Nagaraj

Soundtrack
The music was composed by M. Ranga Rao. All the songs composed for the film were received extremely well and considered evergreen songs.

References

External links
 ಅರಳಿದೆ ಅರಳಿದೆ ಮುದುಡಿದ ತಾವರೆ ಅರಳಿದೆ

1983 films
1980s Kannada-language films
Indian romantic drama films
Films scored by M. Ranga Rao
Films based on Indian novels
1983 romantic drama films